A precinct captain, also known as a precinct chairman, precinct delegate, precinct committee officer or precinct committeeman, is an elected official in the American political party system. The office establishes a direct link between a political party and the voters in a local election district.

Election to the office is by ballot or by the county party executive committee. Voters file their declaration of candidacy with their party in their voting district. If elected during the primary, the Precinct Captain shall serve as long as one remains eligible, or until seeking reelection in the subsequent district primary. Requirements vary among states and counties.

Responsibilities of the post include facilitating voter registration and absentee ballot access; leading get out the vote outreach efforts; distributing campaign and party literature; promoting the party; and addressing voter concerns. In many states Precinct Captains are also eligible to establish party unit committees for fundraising.

It is a grassroots position with officials generally serving as volunteers, though in some states they receive a stipend. Positions of county captain have also been created, but are usually used for election campaigns rather than party organizing.

In Illinois, Michelle Obama got her initial introduction to Democratic party politics when her father served as a Precinct Captain and the then-Michelle Robinson accompanied the elder Robinson on his rounds through his precinct.

In the State of Washington, this office is known as the "Precinct Committee Officer". In Washington, in case of a vacancy in the state legislature, the precinct committee officers will nominate candidates to fill the vacancy, which then need to be approved by the county council. In the State of Oregon, this office is defined in state law under Oregon Revised Statue 248.015 as "Precinct Committee Person".

Office title designation by state
Arizona - Precinct Committeeman
Michigan - Precinct Delegate (officially, but less commonly, referred to as Delegate To County Convention)
Oregon - Precinct Committee Person
Washington - Precinct Committee Officer
Idaho - Precinct Committeeman

References

Sources
 Lincoln, Abraham and Don E. Fehrenbacher. ''Speeches and writings. page 66. Online Google Books. June 19, 2008.
Advanced Placement U.S. Government and Politics Online. June 19, 2008.

Political parties in the United States
Elections in the United States